The Veado River is a river of south-western Espírito Santo state in eastern Brazil. It is a tributary of the Itabapoana River on the border with the state of Rio de Janeiro.

See also
List of rivers of Espírito Santo

References
Brazilian Ministry of Transport

Rivers of Espírito Santo